Oženiše me muzikom (trans. They Married Me to Music) is a 3-piece compilation album from the Serbian rock band Galija, released in 2009. With the release of the album the band marked thirty years from the release of their debut album Prva plovidba. Oženiše me muzikom features two discs with a choice of Galija songs recorded during 1979-1996 period (the choice was made by the band members Nenad Milosavljević and Predrag Milosavljević), and a DVD entitled Kamera kao svedok (Camera as a Witness), with a choice of Galija music videos (the choice was made by Nenad Milosavljević).

Track listing

Disc One
"Gospi" – 4:51
"Decimen" – 9:48
"Avanturista" – 4:25
"Letnja pesma" – 4:36
"Posrednik" – 7:32
"Bilo je to jednom" – 6:24
"Da li postoji put" – 7:45
"Još uvek sanjam" – 5:29
"Burna pijana noć" – 4:44
"Meksiko" – 4:50
"San" – 4:57
"Bilo je dobro" – 4:00
"Jednom" – 5:07
"Digni ruku" – 3:28

Disc Two
"Da li si spavala" – 3:10
"Žena koje nema" – 4:10
"Nebo nad Makarskom" – 3:50
"Kao i obično" – 4:03
"Noć" – 5:08
"Kad me pogledaš" – 4:38
"Trava" – 2:51
"Trube" – 3:36
"Da me nisi" – 3:52
"Seti se maja" – 3:17
"Pravo slavlje" – 4:20
"Na Drini ćuprija" – 2:53
"Dodirni me" – 5:43
"Mlada, lepa i pametna" – 4:43
"Uzalud se trudiš" – 5:16
"Od kad te nema" – 3:42
"Narode moj" – 4:18
"Uzalud" – 4:19
"Cvetom do nje" – 3:11

Kamera kao svedok
"Još uvek sanjam"
"Burna pijana noć"
"Žena koje nema"
"Da li si spavala"
"Skadarska"
"Na tvojim usnama"
"Kad me pogledaš"
"Pod noktima"
"Seti se maja"
"Trube"
"Da me nisi"
"Godina"
"Pevajmo"
"Dodirni me"
"Ja nisam odavde"
"Veruj mi"
"Otkad te nema"
"Balada o očevima"
"Uzalud"

Personnel
Nenad Milosavljević - vocals, acoustic guitar, harmonica
Predrag Milosavljević - vocals, tambourine
Goran Ljubisavljević - guitar
Predrag Branković - bass guitar
Boban Pavlović - drums
Ljubodrag Vukadinović - keyboards
Dušan Radivojević - guitar
Zoran Radosavljević - bass guitar
Nebojša Marković - keyboards
Branislav Radulović - guitar
Saša Lokner - keyboards
Jean-Jacques Roscam - guitar
Bratislav Zlatković - keyboards, flute, guitar
Predrag Milanovic - bass guitar
Dragutin Jakovljević - guitar
Bratislav Milosević - bass guitar
Oliver Jezdić - keyboards

References
Oženiše me muzikom

2009 compilation albums
PGP-RTS compilation albums
Galija compilation albums